The Polytechnic University of the Philippines, General Luna also known as PUP-GLQ is one of the four (4) satellite campuses of the Polytechnic University of the Philippines in Quezon province located at General Luna, Quezon, Philippines. The only undergraduate program being offered in this extension is the Bachelor in Elementary Education.

Courses

Undergraduate Programs 

 Bachelor in Elementary Education (BEED)
 Bachelor of Science in Business Administration (BSBA) major in Marketing Management

External links 
 Polytechnic University of the Philippines – Official website

Polytechnic University of the Philippines
Universities and colleges in Quezon